Sapho ciliata, also known by its common name western bluewing is a species of damselfly from the genus Sapho. The species was first described in 1781.

References

Calopterygidae
Insects described in 1781